Teymur Suri-ye Sofla (also Romanized as Teymūr Sūrī-ye Soflá) is a village in Firuzabad Rural District, Firuzabad District, Selseleh County, Lorestan Province, Iran. At the 2006 census, its population was 99, in 23 families.

References 

Towns and villages in Selseleh County